General elections were held in Montserrat in 1937. They were the first elections since the 1860s.

Background
The partially elected Legislative Assembly dissolved itself in 1866 and was replaced with a wholly appointed body. This remained in place until 1937 when constitutional reforms reintroduced elected members. The reorganised legislature had nine seats; four elected, three held by government officials and two by nominees appointed by the Governor.

Results
The six members elected or appointed were:
John Clifford Llewelyn Wall
H F Shand
James H Meade
Alfred H Allen
Randoph Howes
A W Griffin

References

Elections in Montserrat
Montserrat
1937 in Montserrat
Election and referendum articles with incomplete results